Jonathan "Jon" Brooks (born June 22, 1957) is an American football linebacker who played in the National Football League for the Philadelphia Eagles, Detroit Lions, Atlanta Falcons and St. Louis Cardinals.

References

Living people
1957 births
American football linebackers
Detroit Lions players
Atlanta Falcons players
St. Louis Cardinals (football) players
Clemson Tigers football players